David Douglas Archer (16 April 1928 – 25 March 1992) was a British field hockey player. He competed in the men's tournament at the 1956 Summer Olympics.

References

External links
 

1928 births
1992 deaths
British male field hockey players
Olympic field hockey players of Great Britain
Field hockey players at the 1956 Summer Olympics
Sportspeople from London